Carter Rycroft (born August 29, 1977) is a Canadian curler from Sherwood Park, Alberta. He was a member of the Canadian Olympic team, skipped by Kevin Martin, that won a silver medal at the 2002 Winter Olympics.

Career
Rycroft joined the Martin rink in 1999 after skipping Team Alberta at the 1998 Canadian Junior Curling Championships and playing for Randy Ferbey. With Martin, he won two provincial championships (2000, 2006), two Canada Cups (2005, 2006) and the Olympic silver medal (2002). He left the Martin rink in 2006 and joined the Kevin Koe rink. Rycroft won another Canada Cup playing second with Koe, followed by his first Brier championship title at Halifax in 2010. The team beat Ontario's Glenn Howard 6-5 in the final. At the 2014 Kamloops Brier the Koe rink repeated as Canadian champions, defeating John Morris' B.C. rink 10-5 in the final.  In 2014, Koe left the team, and was replaced by Morris as skip.

Personal life
Rycroft is the owner of the Prairie West Ventures and Majestic Rentals. He is married to Sheila Rycroft and has three children. At the 2014 Brier Rycroft, whose wife was pregnant, said he planned to take a year off curling. However, since the team won the Brier in 2014, he continued to play in certain events.

Teams

References

External links
 

1977 births
Brier champions
Curlers at the 2002 Winter Olympics
Curlers from Alberta
Living people
Medalists at the 2002 Winter Olympics
Olympic medalists in curling
Olympic silver medalists for Canada
People from Grande Prairie
Sportspeople from Sherwood Park
World curling champions
Canadian male curlers
Continental Cup of Curling participants
Canada Cup (curling) participants